Leigh Redhead (born 18 November 1971, in Adelaide, South Australia) is an Australian mystery writer.

She is best known as the creator of the character Simone Kirsch, a stripper who leaves the sex industry to become a private investigator. Redhead drew upon her own experiences as a stripper in creating the character.

Awards
 Sydney Morning Herald's 2005 Best Young Australian Novelists – for Peepshow
 Sydney Morning Herald's 2006 Best Young Australian Novelists – for Rubdown
 Davitt Award 2005 – Readers' Choice for Peepshow
 Davitt Award 2006 – Readers' Choice for Rubdown
 Davitt Award 2008 – Highly Commended for Cherry Pie

Works
Peepshow (2004)
Rubdown (2005)
Cherry Pie (2007)
Thrill City (2010)

References

Citations

Bibliography
Five ways with words Sydney Morning Herald (Retrieved 10 October 2007)
Austlit – Redhead, Leigh

External links

Simone Kirsch Homepage

Living people
People from Adelaide
1971 births
Australian crime writers
Australian female erotic dancers
Australian women novelists
Women mystery writers
21st-century Australian women writers
21st-century Australian writers